Rudbar Hoseyn Beyg (also Romanized as Rūdbar Ḩoseyn Beyg; also known as Rūdbarreh) is a village in Zirtang Rural District, Kunani District, Kuhdasht County, Lorestan Province, Iran. At the 2006 census, its population was 161, in 25 families.

References 

Towns and villages in Kuhdasht County